Elections to Cumbria County Council were held on 12 April 1973. This was on the same day as other UK county council elections. The whole council of 82 members was up for election and the council fell under no overall control.

The election was the first to take place to the new non-metropolitan county council of Cumbria as defined by the Local Government Act 1972, which had reformed local government in England and Wales. The council acted as a "shadow authority" until 1 April 1974, when it gained control from its predecessor county councils, Cumberland, Westmorland County Council, and parts of Lancashire and the West Riding of Yorkshire.

Results

References

Cumbria
1973
1970s in Cumbria